"Westlawn", also known as Charles Essig House, is a historic home located in Wallingford, Delaware County, Pennsylvania. It was built in 1882, and is a -story, asymmetrical dwelling with a cross gable roof and faceted pentagon addition, in the Queen Anne style. It has a variety of exterior treatments including brick, clapboard, novelty shingles, half-timber beams, and stucco. It features gable dormers, a turret, a square tower, wraparound porch, and three corbelled chimneys. The house was built for Charles Essig, organizer and first dean of the School of Dentistry, University of Pennsylvania.

It was listed on the National Register of Historic Places in 1988.

References

Houses on the National Register of Historic Places in Pennsylvania
Queen Anne architecture in Pennsylvania
Houses completed in 1882
Houses in Delaware County, Pennsylvania
National Register of Historic Places in Delaware County, Pennsylvania